Cornelia Dries (born 4 March 1961) is a German former professional tennis player.

Born in Düsseldorf, Dries competed on the professional tour in the 1980s.

As a qualifier into the main draw of the 1982 French Open, she made it through to the second round, with a win over Rosalyn Fairbank.

Dries won a silver medal for West Germany at the 1983 Summer Universiade in Edmonton, partnering Jochen Settelmeyer.

References

External links
 
 

1961 births
Living people
West German female tennis players
Universiade medalists in tennis
Universiade silver medalists for West Germany
Sportspeople from Düsseldorf
Medalists at the 1983 Summer Universiade
Tennis people from North Rhine-Westphalia